Carlos Alberto Bonacich (born 17 November 1931) is an Argentine former swimmer. He competed in the men's 400 metre freestyle at the 1952 Summer Olympics.

References

1931 births
Living people
Argentine male swimmers
Olympic swimmers of Argentina
Swimmers at the 1952 Summer Olympics
Place of birth missing (living people)
Swimmers at the 1951 Pan American Games
Pan American Games medalists in swimming
Pan American Games bronze medalists for Argentina
Argentine male freestyle swimmers
Medalists at the 1951 Pan American Games
20th-century Argentine people